Adrienne Cooper (September 1, 1946 – December 25, 2011) was a Yiddish singer, musician and activist who was integral to the contemporary revival of klezmer music.

In addition to her work as a Yiddish singer she was the assistant director at the YIVO Institute for Jewish Research, program director for the Museum of Chinese in America, and executive officer for programming and executive officer for external affairs for the Workmen's Circle. She co-founded KlezKamp. She was a member of Jews for Racial and Economic Justice's Board of Directors until the summer of 2011, when she was diagnosed with cancer. Cooper won the Rabbi Marshall T. Meyer Risk Taker Award from the Jews for Racial and Economic Justice in 2010, as well as KlezKanada's Lifetime Achievement Award in Yiddish Arts and Culture.

She died of adrenal cancer at Roosevelt Hospital in Manhattan on December 25, 2011, aged 65. She had been diagnosed in July 2011 and underwent surgery in August 2011.

Cooper is survived by her daughter, Sarah Mina Gordon, a vocalist and co-leader of the band "Yiddish Princess", as well as her mother, two brothers, and her partner, Marilyn Lerner, a pianist-composer.

A memorial service was held on the morning of December 28, 2011, at Congregation B'nai Shalom in Walnut Creek, California. The service was followed by a graveside funeral at Oakmont Cemetery in Lafayette, California. A memorial service in New York City was held on January 1, 2012 at Congregation Ansche Chesed. Shiva was held at Cooper's daughter's apartment in New York City.

"A Kholem/Dreaming in Yiddish: A Concert in Tribute to Adrienne Cooper" was organized for December 22, 2012, at the Kaye Playhouse at Hunter College in New York City. More than 50 Yiddish and klezmer musicians and global colleagues performed songs that Adrienne taught, sang, and recorded – these include the Klezmatics, Michael Wex, Shura Lipovsky, Dan Kahn, Theresa Tova, Zalmen Mlotek, Eleanor Reissa, Wolf Krakowski, Michael Alpert, Michael Winograd, Sarah Gordon. The Adrienne Cooper Fund for Dreaming in Yiddish has been set up. The Foundation holds an annual concert in her memory, where a financial award presented "to an individual pursuing the timeless, boundless, utterly unexpected advantage of working in Yiddish."

Discography

Solo Recordings
 Enchanted (2010)
 Dreaming in Yiddish (1995)

Recordings 
 Ghetto Tango [Zalmen Mlotek] (2000)
 Mikveh [Alicia Svigals, Margot Leverett, Lauren Brody, Nicki Parrot] (2001)

References

External links
 Biography on the Jewish Music Web Center website
 Adrienne Cooper's website
 2010 Interview with Adrienne Cooper 
 

1946 births
2011 deaths
Yiddish-language singers of the United States
Klezmer musicians
Bundists
Jewish American musicians
Musicians from Oakland, California
Deaths from cancer in New York (state)
Deaths from adrenocortical cancer
LGBT Jews
American LGBT singers